Probalign is a sequence alignment tool that calculates a maximum expected accuracy alignment using partition function posterior probabilities. Base pair probabilities are estimated using an estimate similar to  Boltzmann distribution. The partition function is calculated using a dynamic programming approach.

Algorithm 
The following describes the algorithm used by probalign to determine the base pair probabilities.

Alignment score 
To score an alignment of two sequences two things are needed:
 a similarity function  (e.g. PAM, BLOSUM,...)
 affine gap penalty: 
The score  of an alignment a is defined as: 

Now the boltzmann weighted score of an alignment a is: 

 

Where  is a scaling factor.

The probability of an alignment assuming boltzmann distribution is given by 

Where  is the partition function, i.e. the sum of the boltzmann weights of all alignments.

Dynamic Programming 
Three different cases are considered:
  the partition function of all alignments of the two prefixes that end in a match.
  the partition function of all alignments of the two prefixes that end in an insertion .
  the partition function of all alignments of the two prefixes that end in a deletion .
Then we have:

Initialization 
The matrixes are initialized as follows:

Recursion 
 
 
  analogously

Base pair probability 
Finally the probability that positions  and  form a base pair is given by:

 are the respective values for the recalculated  with inversed base pair strings.

See also 
 ProbCons
 Multiple Sequence Alignment

References

External links 
 Probalign Webservice

Sequence alignment algorithms